For the Money is a 2019 Argentine drama film directed by Alejo Moguillansky. It was screened in the Directors' Fortnight section at the 2019 Cannes Film Festival. Later that year, it competed at the Latin American Competition of the  34th Mar del Plata International Film Festival.

Cast
 Alejo Moguillansky
 Gabriel Chwojnik
 Luciana Acuña
 Matthieu Perpoint

References

External links
 

2019 films
2019 drama films
Argentine drama films
2010s Spanish-language films
2010s Argentine films